Convent is a census-designated place in and the parish seat of St. James Parish, Louisiana, United States. It has been the parish seat since 1869. It is part of the New Orleans Metropolitan Area .

As of the 2010 census, its population was 711, and 2018 estimates put the parish at 2174 people, 61% of whom were African American.  The 2018 median household income was $52,292 above the state's average.

History 

The community was originally named Baron when first settled 1722 to 1739. It was the location of the St. Michael's Convent (Order of the Sacred Heart) from 1825 to 1932 and the location of Jefferson College, 1831 to 1931.

St. Michael's Church Historic District and Jefferson College (now a Jesuit retreat center called Manresa House of Retreats), along with several historic homes in Convent, are listed on the National Register of Historic Places.

On February 23, 2016, an extremely large wedge tornado hit the Sugar Hill RV park with two dead and several people injured.

Industry 
The town of Convent is home to a Royal Dutch Shell, Hydrogen cracking refinery that can produce 210k barrels of day of consumer petroleum products. As of July 2020, Shell was considering selling the plant. The plant produces 129,000 kg of annual air emissions that are high risk, including Cobalt and cobalt compounds.

Geography 

Demographics

Notable person
 Jarvis Landry is an American football wide receiver and return specialist for the New Orleans Saints of the National Football League. He also played college football at LSU.

References

Census-designated places in St. James Parish, Louisiana
New Orleans metropolitan area
Parish seats in Louisiana
Census-designated places in Louisiana
Louisiana populated places on the Mississippi River